Canela may refer to:

Places 
 Canela, Rio Grande do Sul, a town in Brazil
 Canela, Chile, a commune in Chile
 La Canela, a legendary location in South America
 Isla Canela, an island in Andalusia, Spain

Other uses 
 Canela (surname), including a list of people with the name 
 Canela Cox (born 1984), American singer and songwriter
 Canela, character in the 2002 Venezuelan telenovela Mambo y canela
 Canela people, an indigenous people of Brazil
 Canela language, a Ge language of Brazil
 Canela (Mexico City Metrobús), a BRT station in Mexico City

See also 
 Canella, a genus of plant
 Canella, earlier English name for cinnamon
 Canelas (disambiguation)
 Cannelle (disambiguation)
 Kanela

Language and nationality disambiguation pages